New Zealand sent a team of 20 athletes to the 2022 World Athletics Championships. Their best result was fourth place, achieved by Tom Walsh in the men's shot put.

Entrants

Key
Q = Qualified for the next round by placing (track events) or automatic qualifying target (field events)
q = Qualified for the next round as a fastest loser (track events) or by position (field events)
AR = Area (Continental) Record
NR = National record
PB = Personal best
SB = Season best
Where placings are listed as x(y), x = place in heat (for track events) or group (for field events), y = overall placing
- = Round not applicable for the event

References

Nations at the 2022 World Athletics Championships